Eustephia is a genus of South American plants in the Amaryllis family. All 6 known species are native to Peru, with the range of one species extending also into Bolivia.

Species

formerly included
Several names have been coined using the name Eustephia but referring to species now considered better suited to other genera (Hieronymiella or Phycella). Here are links to help you find appropriate information

References

Amaryllidaceae genera
Flora of South America
Taxa named by Antonio José Cavanilles